This list of Kansas reptiles includes the snakes, turtles and lizards found in the US state of Kansas.

Turtles
Kansas is home to 15 species of turtles.

Family Chelydridae – snapping turtles
 Alligator snapping turtle
 Common snapping turtle

Family Kinosternidae – mud and musk turtles
 Common musk turtle (stinkpot)
 Yellow mud turtle

Family Emydidae – basking and box turtles
 Painted turtle
 Common map turtle
 Ouachita map turtle
 False map turtle
 River cooter
 Ornate box turtle
 Eastern box turtle
 Pond slider turtle

Family Trionychidae – softshell turtles
 Spiny softshell turtle
 Smooth softshell turtle

Lizards
There are 16 species of lizards in Kansas. 

Anguidae – lateral fold lizards
 Slender glass lizard
Crotaphytidae – collared and leopard lizards
 Eastern collared lizard
Gekkonidae – geckos
 Mediterranean gecko (introduced)
Lacertidae – lacertas (wall and true lizards)
 Western green lizard (introduced)
 Italian wall lizard (introduced)
Phrynosomatidae – spiny lizards
 Lesser earless lizard
 Texas horned lizard
 Prairie lizard (Sceloporus consobrinus)
Scincidae – skinks
 Coal skink
 Skin colored black dotted skink
 Five-lined skink
 Broadhead skink
 Great Plains skink
 Southern prairie skink (Plestiodon obtusirostris)
 Northern prairie skink (Plestiodon septentrionalis)
 Ground skink
Teiidae – whiptails
 Six-lined racerunner

Venomous species 

Cottonmouth (Agkistrodon piscivorus)
Copperhead (Agkistrodon contortrix)
Western diamondback rattlesnake (Crotalus atrox) (very rare)
Timber rattlesnake species in need of conservation  (Crotalus horridus)
Prairie rattlesnake (Crotalus viridis)
Massasauga (Sistrurus catenatus)

Non-venomous species 
Eastern glossy snake (Arizona elegans)
Western worm snake (Carphophis vermis)
Eastern racer (Coluber constrictor)
Ringneck snake (Diadophis punctatus)
Western hognose snake (Heterodon nasicus)
Eastern hognose snake (Heterodon platirhinos)
Night snake (Hypsiglena torquata)MT
Prairie kingsnake (Lampropeltis calligaster)
Common kingsnake (Lampropeltis getula)
Milk snake (Lampropeltis triangulum)
New Mexico blind snake (Leptotyphlops dissectus)
Coachwhip (Masticophis flagellum)
Plainbelly water snake (Nerodia erythrogaster)
Diamondback water snake (Nerodia rhombifer)
Northern water snake (Nerodia sipedon)
Rough green snake (Opheodrys aestivus)
Great Plains rat snake (Pantherophis emoryi)
Western rat snake (Elaphe obsoleta)
Gopher snake (Pituophis catenifer)
Graham's crayfish snake (Regina grahamii)
Longnose snake (Rhinocheilus lecontei)
Ground snake (Sonora semiannulata)
Brown snake (Storeria dekayi)
Redbelly snake species in need of conservation (Storeria occipitomaculata)
Flathead snake (Tantilla gracilis)
Plains blackhead snake (Tantilla nigriceps)
Checkered garter snake (Thamnophis marcianus)
Western ribbon snake (Thamnophis proximus)
Plains garter snake (Thamnophis radix)
Common garter snake (Thamnophis sirtalis)
Lined snake (Tropidoclonion lineatum)
Rough earth snake (Virginia striatula)
Smooth earth snake (Virginia valeriae)

MT This snake has enlarged grooved teeth near the back of the upper jaw and secretes a mildly toxic saliva to incapacitate its prey. However, it is not considered dangerous to humans.

References 

Kansas